Pona Machan Thirumbi Vandhan is a 1954 Indian Tamil-language comedy film directed by C. Srinivasa Rao. The dialogues were written by V. Seetharaman and screenplay by Mercury Films' Story Department. Based on the novel Punarjanmam by Thumilan, it stars Sriram and Kusalakumari. The film was released on 27 November 1954 and did not succeed commercially.

Plot 
The film tells of a young man named Sambu. He is from a well-to-do family and spends his days chewing betel leaves and tobacco. He is fond of telling stories about old times to his servant Kittan. The young man is fond of his sister Chandra. He is keen on getting her married to a suitable young man and keeping the couple in his house. A young man Thyagu, who was mostly in North India and sick of Chappathi – Kuruma, wishes to get back home and replies to the ad. Another person and his sister Vimala then come to Sambhu's house. Not interested in the "Ad for groom" business. Chandra leaves the house. She meets Thyagu and unaware of each other's identity, they fall in love. They meet with a car accident and the rich owners takes them home for treatment, thinking they are a married couple. Afraid of scandals, they change their names, leading to more complications. Resolving the complications occupies the rest of the film.

Cast 

Male cast
 Sriram as Thyagu
 Shankaramoorthi as Rathnam
 Thangavelu as Sambu
 Ganapathi Bhatt
 Friend Ramasami
 Sampathkumar
 T. K. Ramachandran
 Velappan
 C. P. Kittan as Kittan
 Ganesh Singh
 Raja Wahab Kashmiri
Male Support Cast
 Shankar, Mani Bhagavathar, Kottayam Kailasa Bhagavathar, Prasad, Varadarajan, Kuntu Pillai, and R. K. Krishnan Mudaliar.

Female cast
 Kusalakumari as Chandra
 Lakshmikantha as Vimala
 Angamuthu as
 Rathnam
 Ranganayaki
 Jayagowri
 Saraswathi
 Saroja
 Varada Bai
 Rukmani
 Lakshmi

Soundtrack 
Music by M. S. Viswanathan, C. N. Pandurangan and lyrics were written by V. Seetharaman and N. S. Chithambaram.

Release 
Pona Machan Thirumbi Vandhan was released on 27 November 1954, and did not succeed commercially.

References

External links 
 

1950s Tamil-language films
1954 films
1959 comedy films
Films based on Indian novels
Films scored by M. S. Viswanathan
Indian black-and-white films
Films scored by C. N. Pandurangan
Indian comedy films